Miss Maranhão is a Brazilian Beauty pageant which selects the representative for the State of Maranhão at the Miss Brazil contest. The pageant was created in 1955 and has been held every year since with the exception of 1990-1991, 1993, and 2020. The pageant is held annually with representation of several municipalities. Since 2022, the State director of Miss Maranhão is, Dominique Silva. Maranhão still has yet to win a crown in the national contest.

Results Summary

Placements
Miss Brazil: 
1st Runner-Up: 
2nd Runner-Up: Mical Pinheiro Pacheco (1997); Deise D'anne de Sousa (2016)
3rd Runner-Up: 
4th Runner-Up: 
Top 5/Top 8/Top 9: 
Top 10/Top 11/Top 12: Thatiana Soares Rodrigues (1985); Larissa Pires de Faria (2014); Isadora Amorim Tobias (2015); Ana Beatriz Nazareno (2017); Natália Seipel Nikolić (2022)
Top 15/Top 16: Roberta Ribeiro Tavares (2008)

Special Awards
Miss Congeniality: 
Miss Be Emotion: 
Miss Popular Vote: 
Best State Costume:

Titleholders

Table Notes

References

External links
Official Miss Brasil Website

Women in Brazil
Maranhão
Miss Brazil state pageants